Tianjin Foreign Studies University (TFSU), nickname as "天外", is one of the top eight foreign studies universities in China.

As a renowned teaching and research institution, Tianjin Foreign Studies University specializes in foreign language and culture studies. Language concentrations include  English, Japanese, German, French, Russian, Korean, Spanish, Portuguese, Swahili and Arabic. In particular, the university's English and Japanese studies programs are among the top in the country. The institution also offers programs in Chinese language and culture for foreign exchange students from other countries.

The university is located at 117 Machang Road (马场道 Mǎchǎngdào), on the north of Hexi District (河西区 Héxīqū), bordering Heping District (和平区 Hépíngqū). The area, being a famous historic tourist site in China, is one of the few places in China that has well preserved the European architecture from the early-20th Century.

Academics

Accreditation and memberships 
TFSU is a member of SAP University Alliances.

References

External links
Website of Tianjin Foreign Studies University (in English)
Website of Tianjin Foreign Studies University (in Chinese)

Universities and colleges in Tianjin
Language education in China